Mesiniaga Tower or Menara Mesiniaga is a futuristic building located in SS16, Subang Jaya, Selangor, Malaysia. It is owned by Mesiniaga Berhad. The building is situated near Subang Parade and Empire Subang.

History 
The construction of this high-tech building began in 1990 and was completed in 1992. After completion, architect Ken Yeang's long research into bio-climatic design principles was recognised with the Aga Khan Award for Architecture in 1995 for the design.

This was built by Siah Brothers Construction Sdn Berhad, nowadays known as SBC Corporation Berhad, listed on Bursa Malaysia.

References

1993 establishments in Malaysia
Office buildings in Selangor
Skyscraper office buildings in Malaysia
Subang Jaya
Office buildings completed in 1993
Postmodern architecture in Malaysia
20th-century architecture in Malaysia